Logovsky is a rural locality (a khutor) and the administrative center of Logoskoye Rural Settlement, Kalachyovsky District, Volgograd Oblast, Russia. The population was 2,583 as of 2010. There are 37 streets.

Geography 
Logovsky is located 71 km southwest of Kalach-na-Donu (the district's administrative centre) by road. Pervomaysky is the nearest rural locality.

References 

Rural localities in Kalachyovsky District